Enrico James (born 12 April 1985) is a South African badminton player. In 2011, he won the bronze medal at the All-Africa Games in the mixed doubles event partnered with Stacey Doubell. In 2012, he won the bronze and silver medal in the men's and mixed doubles respectively at the African Championships in Addis Ababa, Ethiopia.

Achievements

All-Africa Games 
Mixed doubles

African Championships 
Men's doubles

Mixed doubles

BWF International Challenge/Series
Men's doubles

Mixed doubles

 BWF International Challenge tournament
 BWF International Series tournament
 BWF Future Series tournament

References

External links
 

1985 births
Living people
South African male badminton players
Competitors at the 2011 All-Africa Games
African Games silver medalists for South Africa
African Games bronze medalists for South Africa
African Games medalists in badminton
21st-century South African people